Old Square is a public square in Bishkek, the capital of Kyrgyzstan.

History 
The construction of the area started in 1936 on the occasion of the 19th anniversary of the October Revolution. Construction of the square continued during the Great Patriotic War (known as World War II in the West) and was completed in 1954. In 1957, a Government House was built, in which the Central Committee of the Communist Party of Kirghizia and the Council of Ministers of the Kyrgyz SSR convened. The square began its reconstruction in 1964, with the renovation effort being led by Soviet architect Yevgeny Pisarskoi. By 1970, the square had now included a city theatre. The square served as a place for military parades and rallies during the Soviet era. After the opening of Ala-Too Square in 1984, the square became less important and was used less often. in June 2016, a group of private investors decided to renovate the square as a gift to the City of Bishkek.

Landmarks 
 American University of Central Asia
 Government House/Office of the Prime Minister of Kyrgyzstan.
 Panfilov Park
 Glory Monument

See also 

 Government of Kyrgyzstan
 Ala-Too Square
 Toktogul Square
 Victory Square, Bishkek
 Panfilov Street, Bishkek

References 

National squares
Squares in Bishkek